In enzymology, a ribose 1,5-bisphosphate phosphokinase is an enzyme that catalyzes the chemical reaction

ATP + ribose 1,5-bisphosphate  ADP + 5-phospho-alpha-D-ribose 1-diphosphate

Thus, the two substrates of this enzyme are ATP and ribose 1,5-bisphosphate, whereas its two products are ADP and 5-phospho-alpha-D-ribose 1-diphosphate.

This enzyme belongs to the family of transferases, specifically those transferring phosphorus-containing groups (phosphotransferases) with a phosphate group as acceptor.  The systematic name of this enzyme class is ATP:ribose-1,5-bisphosphate phosphotransferase. Other names in common use include ribose 1,5-bisphosphokinase, and PhnN.  This enzyme participates in pentose phosphate pathway.

References

 

EC 2.7.4
Enzymes of unknown structure